Pigüeces is one of fifteen parishes (administrative divisions) in Somiedo, a municipality within the province and autonomous community of Asturias, in northern Spain.  

The postal code is 33842.

Villages
 Aguasmestas
 Pigüeces
 Santullano (Santuchanu)

Parishes in Somiedo